Gary Joseph Lachman (born December 24, 1955), also known as Gary Valentine, is an American writer and musician. He came to prominence in the mid-1970s as the bass guitarist for rock band Blondie. Since the 1990s, Lachman has written full-time, often about mysticism and occultism.

Biography

Musical career 
Lachman joined Blondie in spring 1975 after original bassist Fred Smith left to join Television amid founding bassist Richard Hell's departure. He wrote the music to the band's first single, "X-Offender", and popularized the band's sixties-retro look. In 1977 he left the group to form his own band and was replaced by Nigel Harrison, just as Blondie were starting to gain recognition. His song "(I'm Always Touched by Your) Presence, Dear" was a UK top ten hit in 1978, and was subsequently recorded by Tracey Ullman and Annie Lennox.

After Blondie, Lachman moved to Los Angeles and in 1978 released a single, "The First One/Tomorrow Belongs to You" on Beat Records. Shortly after this he formed The Know, with Joel Turrisi and Richard d'Andrea who were the first band to play the infamous Madame Wong's Chinese restaurant-turned-new wave venue. (Lachman's claim to this distinction has been verified by several eyewitnesses.) After a year and a half Joel left the band and was replaced by drummer John McGarvey.  In 1980 The Know released a single "I Like Girls/Dreams" on Planet Records and were the only bi-coastal US "power pop" band, developing large followings in New York and Los Angeles. Failing to secure an album deal, he disbanded The Know and in 1981 played guitar with Iggy Pop.

In 1996, after moving to London, he was asked to participate in the Blondie re-union, and in November of that year he recorded one of his songs, "Amor Fati", with Blondie, for their 'comeback' album. In 1997 he performed with Blondie at several major festival concerts in the US. Back in London Lachman worked with former X-Ray Spex saxophonist Lora Logic. In 1998 he formed Fire Escape together with violinist Ruth Vaughn and performed songs he had written for the Blondie reunion album (they had not been used due to the band ultimately excluding him from the recording process and the reunion tour). They released an EP to little fanfare and went on a permanent hiatus after two years.

A compilation of Lachman's work in music entitled Tomorrow Belongs to You featuring recordings by The Know and Fire Escape, was released in 2003 on the UK label Overground Records.

In 2006, he was inducted into the Rock and Roll Hall of Fame as a former member of Blondie, although vocalist Debbie Harry prohibited Lachman and other ex-members from performing with the current line-up at the ceremony.

Literary career 
Lachman moved to London in 1996 and became a full-time writer, contributing to The Guardian, Mojo, Times Literary Supplement and other journals. His first book, Turn Off Your Mind: The Mystic Sixties and the Dark Side of the Age of Aquarius, appeared in 2001. It was followed in 2002 by New York Rocker: My Life in The Blank Generation, an account of his years on the New York (CBGB) and Los Angeles music scene in the 1970s. In 2003 he produced A Secret History of Consciousness, a study of non-reductive, non-materialist accounts of consciousness, with detailed discussions of Owen Barfield, Julian Jaynes, Jean Gebser, Jurij Moskvitin, hypnagogia, and related themes. The Dedalus Book of the Occult: A Dark Muse (2004) charted the influence of the occult on western literature since the Enlightenment.

The following years saw several more books, on the related themes of consciousness, the counterculture, and the influence of the occult and esoteric thought on mainstream western culture, including biographies of the Russian philosopher P.D. Ouspensky (2004), the Austrian "spiritual scientist" Rudolf Steiner (2007), the Swedish religious thinker Emanuel Swedenborg (2006), the Swiss psychologist Carl Jung (2010) and Colin Wilson (2016). Recent works include a study of writers and suicide, The Dedalus Book of Literary Suicides: Dead Letters (2008), with essays on Walter Benjamin, Yukio Mishima, Hermann Hesse, and others, and a history of occultism and politics, Politics and the Occult: The Right, the Left, and the Radically Unseen (2008), which addresses the theme of fascism and the occult through the work of Julius Evola, Rene Schwaller de Lubicz, Mircea Eliade, and others.

He is a regular contributor to the Independent on Sunday, Fortean Times, and other journals in the US and UK, lectures frequently and occasionally broadcasts on the BBC. His work has been compared to Colin Wilson, and has been translated into German, Finnish, Czech, Russian, French, Dutch, Spanish, Norwegian, Italian and Portuguese. In 2014 Lachman took part in the annual Engelsberg Seminar held in Avesta, Sweden, lecturing on gnosis and the evolution of consciousness in the 21st century. In 2015 Lachman lectured on "Rejected Knowledge" to the Marion Institute as part of their "Living in the Real World" seminar. Recent years have seen Lachman lecturing on a variety of esoteric and cultural topics in Germany, Denmark, Sweden, Norway, France, the Netherlands, Great Britain, and the United States.

Bibliography

Books 
Two Essays on Colin Wilson: World Rejection and Criminal Romantics AND From Outsider to Post-Tragic Man (Colin Wilson Studies) (1994, paperback , hardcover )
Colin Wilson as Philosopher (Colin Wilson Studies) (with John Shand, 1996)
New York Rocker: My Life in the Blank Generation, with Blondie, Iggy Pop and Others, 1974–1981 (2002)
Turn Off Your Mind: The Mystic Sixties and the Dark Side of the Age of Aquarius (2001, 2003)
A Secret History of Consciousness (2003)
The Dedalus Occult Reader: The Garden of Hermetic Dreams (editor of anthology, 2004)
In Search of P. D. Ouspensky: The Genius in the Shadow of Gurdjieff (hardcover, 2004, paperback, 2006) Chapter VI, Online
A Dark Muse: A History of the Occult (2005)
Into the Interior: Discovering Swedenborg (2006)
Rudolf Steiner: An Introduction to His Life and Work (2007)
The Dedalus Book of Literary Suicides: Dead Letters (2008)
Politics and the Occult: The Left, the Right, and the Radically Unseen (2008)
The Dedalus Book of the 1960s: Turn Off Your Mind (updated, enlarged edition 2009)
Jung The Mystic: The Esoteric Dimensions of Carl Jung's Life and Teachings (2010)
The Quest For Hermes Trismegistus From Ancient Egypt to the Modern World (2011)
Madame Blavatsky: The Mother of Modern Spirituality (2012)
Swedenborg: An Introduction to His Life and Ideas (2012)
The Caretakers of the Cosmos: Living Responsibly in an Unfinished World (2013)
Aleister Crowley: Magick, Rock and Roll, and the Wickedest Man in the World (2014)
Revolutionaries of the Soul: Reflections on Magicians, Philosophers, and Occultists (2014)
 The Secret Teachers of the Western World (2015)
 Beyond the Robot: The Life and Work of Colin Wilson (2016)
 Lost Knowledge of the Imagination (2017)
 Dark Star Rising: Magick and Power in the Age of Trump (2018)
 The Return of Holy Russia: Apocalyptic History, Mystical Awakening, and the Struggle for the Soul of the World (2020 )
 Introducing Swedenborg: Correspondences (2021 )
 Dreaming Ahead of Time: Experiences with Precognitive Dreams, Synchronicity and Coincidence (2022)

Articles 
 "The Last of the Magi" (1999) Fortean Times #120, about Eliphas Levi
 "Sympathy for the Devil" (2000) Fortean Times #134, about the Process Church
 "The Mystical Count" (2000) Fortean Times #140, about Count Jan Potocki
 "The Damned" (2001) Fortean Times #150, about James Webb
 "Turn Off Your Mind: Gary Lachman Traces the Influence of the Occult in the Arts" The Independent on Sunday (2001)
 "Waking Sleep"  (2002) Fortean Times #163, about hypnagogia
 "The magical world of Fernando Pessoa" (2004) nth Position, about Fernando Pessoa
 "Absinthe & alchemy" (2004)  Fortean Times #180, about August Strindberg
 "Working it out" (2004) nth Position, about Gurdjieff and Ouspensky
 "Inside the Outsider" (2004) Fortean Times #188. an interview with Colin Wilson
 "Dweller on the Threshold" (2006) Fortean Times #205, about Rudolf Steiner
 "Mystical Experience and the Evolution of Consciousness: 21st Century Gnosis" at Academia.edu
 "If Consciousness Is Evolving, Why Aren't Things Getting Better?" (Spring 2017) Quest magazine #105.2
 "What is Jordan B. Peterson Really Saying?" (2018) New Dawn Magazine #168, about Jordan B. Peterson

References

External links 
Official site
[ Gary Valentine] at Allmusic

  The Philosopher of Punk in the Hampstead and Highgate Express, March 4, 2004
How Colin Wilson Changed my Life or: I had fame, wealth, women were at my feet and then I read The Outsider

Reviews 
The Dedalus Book of the Occult, reviewed by Suzi Feay in The Independent, January 11, 2004
The Garden of Hermetic Dreams, reviewed by Nicholas Lezard in The Guardian, January 1, 2005
In Search of P D Ouspensky, reviewed by Jah Wobble in The Independent, November 7, 2004
Into the Interior: Discovering Swedenborg, reviewed by Tom Boncza-Tomaszewski in The Independent, November 12, 2006
http://www.nytimes.com/2012/04/14/us/gary-lachman-from-blondie-to-swedenborg.html?_r=0 "Spiritual Seekers Quest: From Blondie to Swedenborg" Mark Oppenheimer in The New York Times, April 13, 2012
 https://www.washingtonpost.com/entertainment/books/ufos-alien-abductions-the-occult-to-one-man-the-building-blocks-of-scholarship/2016/08/31/a011dd52-6e13-11e6-9705-23e51a2f424d_story.html "Ufos, alien abductions, the occult: to one man, the building blocks of scholarship" Michael Dirda in The Washington Post, August 31, 2016

1955 births
20th-century American guitarists
American fortean writers
American rock guitarists
American male guitarists
Blondie (band) members
Guitarists from New Jersey
Helena Blavatsky biographers
Living people
Musicians from Bayonne, New Jersey
Place of birth missing (living people)
Writers from Bayonne, New Jersey